Jorge González González (born 22 September 1988), is a Romani Spanish singer.

Jorge González was born in Madrid in 1988 into a humble and hard working family. González emerged into the public eye thanks to his involvement with the popular Spanish singing competition television show Operación Triunfo. Taking part in the show's fifth season, which aired in 2006, González had attempted to convince his parents to allow him to audition for two straight years before he was allowed to present himself at the castings. Living at the time with his parents in Madrid, Jorge had not received any formal musical instruction at the age of 18 when he auditioned. The self-taught pianist and vocalist was in love with the sounds of salsa and Latin pop, known to his family as "el gitanillo que canta boleros." During the competition Jorge relied heavily on composers like Luis Miguel and Juan Luis Guerra for repertoire, ultimately achieving eighth place. Though not the winner, Jorge left Operación Triunfo with significant exposure and a large enough fan base that he was offered a contract with Universal's Vale Music label. González's debut disc, Dikélame, was released in the summer of 2007, that included the single "Xikila baila", that surpassed the 750,000 reproductions in YouTube and was followed by significant national touring. With such repercussion, it realized a tour of concerts by all the country. Later he was alternating his interventions in different programs of television with the galas in direct. Though his travels took him to all corners of Spain, González continues to concentrate his efforts on building his already strong fan base at home in Madrid.  González's second studio album, titled Vengo a enamorarte, was released in 2009. In the year two thousand and nine Jorge got the opportunity to participate in the pre-selection to represent Spain in the Eurovision Song Contest.

Discography
Studio albums
 2007: Dikélame 
 2009: Vengo a enamorarte 

Singles
 "Aunque Se Acabe El Mundo"  
 "Ruido»"  
 "Me Iré"

References

1988 births
Living people
Spanish Romani people
21st-century Spanish singers
21st-century Spanish male singers